Faculty of Sanskrit Vidya Dharma Vijnan is a faculty of Banaras Hindu University (BHU) in the city of Varanasi in India. The Faculty of Sanskrit Vidya Dharma Vijnan, also called SVDV, or the Faculty of SVDV, offers bachelor's, master's and doctoral degrees in the studies of ancient Indian Shastra, Sanskrit language and Sanskrit literature. It was founded by Mahamana Pandit Madan Mohan Malviya in 1918.

History
The Faculty of Sanskrit Vidya Dharma Vijnan was established in 1918 by Mahamana Pandit Madan Mohan Malviya with an aim to preserve and promote the studies of ancient Indian Shastra, Sanskrit language and Sanskrit literature. One of the objectives of this faculty was to remove the misconceptions about religion, spirituality, astrology and tantras in society. This is the only faculty / educational establishment of its kind in the world.

Departments
The faculty has eight departments, through which all courses are imparted. 
 Dharmagam
 Dharmshastra-Mimansa
 Jain-Buddha Darshan
 Jyotish
 Sahitya
 Vaidic Darshan
 Veda
 Vyakaran

See also
 List of educational institutions in Varanasi

References

External links
 Official website

Departments of the Banaras Hindu University
Language education in India
Sanskrit universities in India
Educational institutions established in 1918
1918 establishments in India